Life in General is the third studio album by American punk rock band MxPx, released on November 19, 1996. The album features "Chick Magnet". The album features artwork by the artist Coop. Prior to the release of Slowly Going the Way of the Buffalo (1998), the album had sold over 89,000 copies.

Track listing

Personnel
MxPx
 Mike Herrera – bass guitar, vocals
 Tom Wisniewski – guitar, background vocals
 Yuri Ruley – drums

Production
 Steve Kravac – producer, engineer, drum tech
 Brandon Ebel – executive producer, A&R

Artwork
 Coop – cover art, back art
 Claire Bigbie – layout
 Michele Herrera – photography
 Brandon Ebel – photography

Charts
Album

References
 Citations

Sources

 

1996 albums
MxPx albums
Tooth & Nail Records albums